Rhabdatomis laudamia is a moth in the subfamily Arctiinae. It was described by Herbert Druce in 1885. It is found in Arizona, Guatemala, Costa Rica, Panama, Ecuador, Peru and Rio de Janeiro, Brazil.

References

Moths described in 1885
Cisthenina